EMHS may refer to:
 East Meadow High School, East Meadow, New York, United States
 East Mountain High School, Sandia Park, New Mexico, United States
 Eastern Montgomery High School, Elliston, Virginia, United States
 Edmond Memorial High School, Edmond, Oklahoma, United States
 Eisenhower Middle/High School, Russell, Pennsylvania, United States
 El Modena High School, Orange County, California, United States
 El Monte High School, El Monte, California, United States
 Elkhart Memorial High School, Elhart, Indiana, United States
 Ellender Memorial High School, Houma, Louisiana, United States
 Elmont Memorial Junior – Senior High School, Elmont, New York, United States